is a Japanese voice actress from Osaka Prefecture. Her major voice roles include Hana Uzaki in Uzaki-chan Wants to Hang Out!, Jahy in The Great Jahy Will Not Be Defeated!, Inari Fushimi in Inari, Konkon, Koi Iroha, Chio Miyamo in Chio's School Road, Kiriha in Tsugumomo, Satania in Gabriel DropOut, Ruti Ragnason in Banished from the Hero's Party, and Chieri Ogata in The Idolmaster Cinderella Girls.

Biography
She was born at a hospital in Miyagi Prefecture. Passed through Kanagawa Prefecture and spent the kindergarten period in Ibaraki Prefecture. After that, she spent time in Osaka Prefecture from elementary school, but once lived in Shikoku.

In June 2012, she made her voice actor debut as a child in Saint Seiya Omega.

In January 2014, Ōzora  had her first starring role as Inari Fushimi in Inari, Konkon, Koi Iroha.

Ōzora is affiliated with Aoni Production.

Filmography

Anime
2013
 Noucome – Yuragi Hakoniwa 
 Servant × Service – Seller Girl
 Tanken Driland: Sennen no Mahō – Amuze
 Genshiken: Second Generation – Susanna Hopkins

2014
 Inari, Konkon, Koi Iroha – Inari 
 Marvel Disk Wars: The Avengers – Jessica Shannon
 Sega Hard Girls – SG-1000 II
 Chaika: The Coffin Princess – Karen Bombardier
 Tsubu Doll – Jun

2015
 The Idolmaster Cinderella Girls – Chieri Ogata 
 Triage X – Hinako Kominato
 Robot Girls Z+ – Bal-chan

2016
 Maho Girls PreCure! – Cissy
 Matoi the Sacred Slayer – Yuma Kusanagi
 Momokuri – Norika Mizuyama
 Pretty Guardian Sailor Moon Crystal Season III – Tellu

2017
 Gabriel Dropout – Satanichia McDowell Kurumizawa
 Nyanko Days – Azumi Shiratori
 Tsugumomo – Kiriha
 Kemono Friends – Black-tailed Prairie Dog (ep. 5, 7, 12) 
 One Piece – Charlotte Anana

2018
 Chio's School Road – Chio Miyamo

2019
 Pastel Memories – Michi Edogawabashi
 Wataten!: An Angel Flew Down to Me – Kanon Konomori
 Kandagawa Jet Girls – Pan Dina

2020
 Tsugu Tsugumomo – Kiriha
 Uzaki-chan Wants to Hang Out! – Hana Uzaki
 Maesetsu! – Mafuyu Kogarashi

2021
Heaven's Design Team – Meido
World Trigger Season 2 – Maori Hosoi
Remake Our Life! – Keiko Tomioka
The Great Jahy Will Not Be Defeated! – Jahy
Banished from the Hero's Party – Ruti

2022
Princess Connect! Re:Dive Season 2 – Yuki
Call of the Night – Midori Kohakobe
Lucifer and the Biscuit Hammer – Samidare Asahina
Hanabi-chan Is Often Late – Mogumogu Chō Higashisakura
Uzaki-chan Wants to Hang Out! ω – Hana Uzaki

2023
Reborn to Master the Blade: From Hero-King to Extraordinary Squire – Ripple
Rokudō no Onna-tachi – Sayuri Osanada
World Dai Star – Panda Yanagiba
Level 1 Demon Lord and One Room Hero – Demon Lord

Films
2015
Girls und Panzer der Film – Fukuda

2020
High School Fleet: The Movie – Susan "Sue" Reyes

2022
Wataten!: An Angel Flew Down to Me: Precious Friends – Kanon Konomori

Video games
2011
 The Legend of Heroes: Trails to Azure –  Duvalie

2014 
 The Legend of Heroes: Trails of Cold Steel II – Duvalie

2016
 Ys VIII: Lacrimosa of Dana – Dina, Griselda

2017
 Fire Emblem Heroes  – Ylgr, Lethe
 The Legend of Heroes: Trails of Cold Steel III – Duvalie
 Dead or Alive Xtreme Venus Vacation –  Kanna
 Granblue Fantasy –  The Sun
 Yuki Yuna is a Hero: Hanayui no Kirameki – Yumiko Miroku
 MapleStory –  Cadena (Female) 

2018
 Alice Gear Aegis – Aika Aikawa
 Magia Record – Himika Mao
 Valkyria Chronicles 4 – Nikola Graf
 The Legend of Heroes: Trails of Cold Steel IV – Duvalie

2019
 Konosuba: Fantastic Days – Amy

2020
 Kandagawa Jet Girls –  Pan Dina
 Girls' Frontline –  Falcon, QJY-88
 Azur Lane  –  Perseus
 Sakuna: Of Rice and Ruin –  Sakuna
  Touhou Spell Bubble –  Marisa Kirisame
 Atelier Ryza 2: Lost Legends & the Secret Fairy – Patricia Abelheim
 The Legend of Heroes: Trails into Reverie – Duvalie

2021
 Shin Megami Tensei V – Amanozako

2022
 Digimon Survive – Lopmon
 Azur Lane – Patricia Abelheim

2023
 Atelier Ryza 3: Alchemist of the End & the Secret Key – Patricia Abelheim

References

External links
 Official agency profile 
 

Living people
1989 births
Aoni Production voice actors
Japanese video game actresses
Japanese voice actresses
People from Takatsuki, Osaka
Ritsumeikan University alumni
Voice actresses from Miyagi Prefecture